Marek Geišberg (born 4 May 1982) is a Slovak actor. He was born in the town of Rimavská Sobota, and studied at the Academy of Performing Arts in Bratislava. Geišberg won the Best Supporting Actor award at the Sun in a Net Awards in 2012 for his role in The House. He is the son of Slovak actor Marián Geišberg.

Selected filmography 
Music (2008)
The House (2011)
 (2012)
 (2016)

References

External links

1982 births
People from Rimavská Sobota
Living people
Slovak male film actors
Slovak male stage actors
Slovak male television actors
20th-century Slovak male actors
21st-century Slovak male actors
Sun in a Net Awards winners